Lake Emily is a lake in the U.S. state of Wisconsin.

A variant name is "Emily Lake". Lake Emily was named after Emily Cole, the wife of a pioneer settler.

References

Lakes of Wisconsin
Bodies of water of Portage County, Wisconsin